Thomas Hobbes Scott (17 April 1783 – 1 January 1860) was an English-born Anglican cleric active in the Colony of New South Wales.

Early life 
Scott was born in Kelmscott, Oxford, England, one of the youngest of eight children of James Scott, sometime vicar of Itchen Stoke, Hampshire, and chaplain ordinary to George III, and his wife Jane Elizabeth, née Harmood.

Scott went to France after his father's death and was a vice-consul at Bordeaux and later went bankrupt as a wine merchant.

Scott was a clerk to a British consulate in Italy. Scott matriculated at Oxford University at the late age of 30, on 11 October 1813, and graduated M.A. on 12 November 1818. He was at St Alban Hall, subsequently merged in Merton College. Early in 1819 he was appointed secretary of the commission of John Bigge and Governor Lachlan Macquarie was instructed that in the event of the death or illness of Bigge, Scott would take his place. After his return to England Scott took holy orders and became rector of Whitfield, Northumberland, in 1822.

Early in 1824, at the request of Earl Bathurst, Scott drew up an elaborate plan for providing for churches and schools in Australia. The main idea was that one-tenth of the lands in the colony should be vested in trustees for the support of churches and schools. Primary schools were to be followed by schools for agriculture and trades, and also schools to fit students for a university which was ultimately visualized. He also suggested that pending the establishment of the university a few of the ablest students should be awarded exhibitions to take them to Oxford or Cambridge. His plans were adopted in a modified form.

New South Wales 
Scott was appointed archdeacon of New South Wales on 2 October 1824, and he arrived at Sydney on 7 May 1825. He was also a trustee of the clergy and school lands; this corporation, however, had neither land nor funds. Governor Brisbane opposed his suggestion that "government reserves" should be considered church and school lands, and with regard to land generally, comparatively little of it had even been surveyed. Scott too was working on the assumption that the control of education would be in the hands of the Church of England, which brought vigorous opposition from the Presbyterians, Wesleyans and Roman Catholics. Scott's connexion with Bigge and a friendship he had formed with John Macarthur tended to make him unpopular, and though Governor Darling spoke of him as amiable and well-disposed, he quarrelled with several men of the period. Scott was appointed a member of the New South Wales Legislative Council by reason of his office as archdeacon and was made a member of the Executive Council in 1825. On 1 January 1828, he sent his resignation to England and was succeeded in 1829 as archdeacon by William Grant Broughton, who later was to become the first Bishop of Australia. Scott's final report on the church and school establishment of New South Wales was dated 1 September 1829.

Later life and death 
Scott then set sail for England aboard . The ship struck a reef off Fremantle on 28 November 1829, marooning him in the new Swan River Colony, in which he was the first ordained minister. He ministered alone to the colony for two months, building a temporary church and officiating at the first Christmas celebrations, until he was joined by John Burdett Wittenoom, the appointed colonial chaplain. Scott was well regarded by the colonists and by Wittenoom, and the settlement of Kelmscott, Western Australia, was named after Scott's birthplace.

Scott continued his homeward journey aboard the William, stopping in Old Batavia where he opened an English chapel. On arriving in England, Scott took charge once again of his parish at Whitfield, where he had installed a curate in his absence, and was later made an honorary canon of Durham. He died at Whitfield on 1 January 1860.

Assessment 
Scott was a capable man who was arbitrary and autocratic. He could not get on with his own clergy, and when he visited Tasmania in 1826 a report he made on the state of religion and education raised similar antagonism to that he had experienced in Sydney. He was a hard worker, he had a fine conception of the place education should take in the colony, and during his five years in New South Wales, the number of schools and the number of pupils attending regularly were both more than doubled. His proposed scheme of education in Australia could not be accepted at the time, largely because it assumed the ascendancy of the Church of England, but considered broadly it was a statesmanlike piece of work which must have had much influence on the plans that were later developed.

See also

 St James' Church, Sydney

References

External links 

 Colonial Secretary's papers 1822-1877, State Library of Queensland- includes digitised correspondence and letters written by Scott to the Colonial Secretary of New South Wales on matters relating to the Moreton Bay settlement

1783 births
1860 deaths
Alumni of St Alban Hall, Oxford
Australian Christian clergy
Members of the New South Wales Legislative Council
19th-century Australian politicians